David Paresky is a retired American businessman, who formerly worked in the travel service sector. He is also a well-known philanthropist.

Early life 
Paresky was born in Boston, Massachusetts in 1938. He grew up in Burlington, Vermont. Paresky attended Philips Academy on a scholarship before attending Williams College, also as a scholarship student. He graduated from Williams in 1960 and went on to receive his J.D. from Harvard University in 1963 and then his MBA from Harvard in 1965.

Career 
Paresky began his tenure in travel services at Philips Academy, where he organized spring break trips to Bermuda for students. Later, Paresky turned this interest into a profitable career. After graduation from Harvard, Paresky began Crimson Travel, a successful company that became the largest travel company in the New England region.

Crimson Travel merged with Heritage Travel and then with Thomas Cook Travel, becoming ultimately one of the largest travel companies in the United States. Thomas Cook Travel was founded by Thomas Cook in 1841 in England and survived over the years before moving operations to the United States. American Express purchased Thomas Cook's travel offices in the United States in 1994, which were owned by Paresky and his wife.

Philanthropy 
Paresky has donated significant portions of money to both Philips Academy and Williams College in order to build new student facilities. At Williams, the student center built in 2006 is named Paresky Center in his name after he donated $15.75 million to the school. At Philips Academy, Paresky's $10 million donation was used to renovate its main dining hall, renamed Paresky Commons in 2008.

Personal life 
Paresky currently lives in Fisher Island, Florida with his wife Linda.

He received Williams College's Bicentennial Medal in 2012.

Paresky was one of the investors exploited by Bernie Madoff's Ponzi scheme, which came to light in 2008.

References

1938 births
Williams College alumni
Harvard Law School alumni
American philanthropists
Living people
Harvard Business School alumni
Businesspeople from Boston
People from Burlington, Vermont
Phillips Academy alumni